The Implementation Force (IFOR) was a NATO-led multinational peace enforcement force in Bosnia and Herzegovina under a one-year mandate from 20 December 1995 to 20 December 1996 under the codename Operation Joint Endeavour.

Background

NATO was responsible to the United Nations (UN) for carrying out the Dayton Peace Accords.  The Dayton Peace Accords were started on 22 November 1995 by the presidents of Bosnia, Croatia, and Serbia, on behalf of Serbia and the Bosnian Serb Republic.  The actual signing happened in Paris on 14 December 1995.  The peace accords contained a General Framework Agreement and eleven supporting annexes with maps.  The accords had three major goals: ending of hostilities, authorization of military and civilian program going into effect, and the establishment of a central Bosnian government while excluding individuals that serve sentences or under indictment by the International War Crimes Tribunals from taking part in the running of the government. IFOR's specific role was to implement the military Annexes of The General Framework Agreement for Peace (GFAP) in Bosnia and Herzegovina.

IFOR relieved the UN peacekeeping force UNPROFOR, which had originally arrived in 1992, and the transfer of authority was discussed in Security Council Resolution 1031. Almost 60,000 NATO soldiers in addition to forces from non-NATO nations were deployed to Bosnia. Operation Decisive Endeavor (SACEUR OPLAN 40105), beginning 6 December 1995, was a subcomponent of Joint Endeavor. IFOR began operations on 20 December 1995.

The Dayton Agreement resulted from a long series of events. Notably, the failures of EU-led peace plans, the August 1995 Croat Operation Storm and expelling 200,000 Serb civilians, the Bosnian Serb war crimes, in particular the Srebrenica massacre, and the seizure of UNPROFOR peace-keepers as human shields against NATO's Operation Deliberate Force.

Admiral Leighton W. Smith Jr., Commander in Chief Allied Forces Southern Europe (CINCSOUTH), served as the first Joint Force Commander for the operation, also known as Commander IFOR (COMIFOR). He commanded the operation from IFOR's deployment on 20 December 1995 from headquarters in Zagreb, and later from March 1996 from the Residency in Sarajevo. Admiral Thomas J. Lopez commanded the operation from 31 July to 7 November 1996, followed by General William W. Crouch until 20 December 1996. Lt Gen Michael Walker, Commander Allied Rapid Reaction Corps (ARRC), acted as Land Component Commander for the operation, commanding from HQ ARRC (Forward) based initially in Kiseljak, and from late January 1996 from HQ ARRC (Main) in Ilidža. This was NATO's first ever out-of-area land deployment. The Land Component's part of the operation was known as Operation Firm Endeavour.

At its height, IFOR involved troops from 32 countries and numbered some 54,000 soldiers in-country (BiH) and around 80,000 involved soldiers in total (with support and reserve troops stationed in Croatia, Hungary, Germany, and Italy and also on ships in the Adriatic Sea). In the initial phases of the operation, much of the initial composition of IFOR consisted of units which had been part of UNPROFOR but remained in place and simply replaced their United Nations insignia with IFOR insignia.

Components

NATO member states that contributed forces included Belgium, Canada, Denmark, France, Germany, Italy, Luxembourg, the Netherlands, Norway, Portugal, Spain, Turkey, the United States, and the United Kingdom.  Non-NATO nations that contributed forces included; Australia, Austria, Bangladesh, the Czech Republic, Egypt, Estonia, Finland, Hungary, Latvia, Lithuania, Malaysia, New Zealand, Pakistan, Poland, Romania, Slovakia, Sweden, Russia, and Ukraine.

The tasks of the Land Component were carried out by three Multi National Divisions:
Multi-National Division (South-East), Mostar – French led. Also known as the 'Division salamandre.' MND-SE included two French brigades, one Spanish brigade, one Italian brigade, a Portuguese Parachute Battalion of 700 plus a services and support detachment of 200, and Egyptian, Jordanian and Ukrainian units (around 2,500 men), as well as a Moroccan task force. The divisional headquarters was provided in rotation by divisions including the 7th Armoured Division and the 6th Light Armored Division.
Multi-National Division (South-West), Banja Luka – British led. The British codename for their armed forces' involvement in IFOR was Operation Resolute. MND-SW included a British brigade, a Canadian Brigade (Canadian code name Operation Alliance) and Dutch units. Division headquarters was provided by 3 (UK) Division then 1st (UK) Armoured Division.
Multi-National Division (North), Tuzla – US led. Task Force Eagle. The US Army 1st Armored Division under the command of Major General William L. Nash, constituted the bulk of the ground forces for Task Force Eagle.  They began to deploy on 18 December 1995. MND-N was composed of two U.S. Brigades, a Russian brigade, a Turkish brigade, and the Nordic-Polish Brigade. 
 A Russian brigade, initially under the command of Colonel Alexander Ivanovich Lentsov, was part of the Task Force Eagle effort.
 The 1st Brigade of 1st Armored Division was commanded by Colonel Gregory Fontenot and covered the northwest. The 2nd Brigade of 1st Armored Division, led by Col John Batiste, constituted the southern flank of the US sector, based in Camp Lisa, about 20 km east of Kladanj. Task Force 2–68 Armor, based in Baumholder, Germany (later re-flagged to 1–35 AR), was based in Camp Linda, outside of Olovo. This was the Southern boundary of the US Sector.  The 1AD returned in late 1996 to Germany.
 One of MND-N's components was the Nordic-Polish Brigade (NORDPOLBDE) which was a multinational brigade of Denmark, Estonia, Finland, Latvia, Lithuania, Norway, Poland, Sweden and USA. It was formed in 1996, and till its disestablishment in 2000 it was stationed in Bosnia and Herzegovina as part of both IFOR and SFOR. The Nordic Support Group at Pécs in Hungary handled the relay of supply, personnel and other logistical tasks between the NORDPOL participating countries and their deployed forces in Bosnia and Herzegovina. It comprised several National Support Elements.

On 20 December 1996, the task of IFOR was taken over by SFOR. In turn, SFOR was replaced by the European EUFOR Althea force in 2004.

NATO began to create service medals once it began to support peacekeeping in the former Yugoslavia, which led to the award to IFOR troops of the NATO Medal.

Gallery

See also
National Support Group

Notes

Further reading

Charles Bertin, A Summer in Mostar: 50 days with the Salamander Division, January – June 1996

External links

CCRP Bosnia Research and Publications
Information on Operation Joint Endeavour on the NATO Website

Military operations involving NATO
History of Republika Srpska
NATO-led peacekeeping in the former Yugoslavia
Multinational units and formations
Military history of Bosnia and Herzegovina
United States Marine Corps in the 20th century
Military units and formations established in 1995
Military units and formations disestablished in 1996
Military operations involving Portugal